WVIR-TV (channel 29) is a television station in Charlottesville, Virginia, United States, affiliated with NBC and The CW Plus. Owned by Gray Television, the station has studios on East Market Street (US 250 Business) in downtown Charlottesville, and its transmitter is located on Carters Mountain south of the city.

WVIR-CD (channel 35) operates as a low-power, Class A translator of WVIR-TV.

History
Prior to WVIR's sign-on, the first permittee for channel 29 was the Charlottesville Broadcasting Corporation, owners of WINA radio (1070 AM and then-95.3 FM). Charlottesville Broadcasting obtained the permit in 1965; after two extensions, all plans to put channel 29 on the air under the callsign WINA-TV were abandoned in 1969. WVIR, which had held a permit for channel 64 since 1964, then took the opportunity to move to the lower channel.

WVIR signed on March 11, 1973, as the first television station based in Charlottesville and second outlet (after WHSV-TV) between Richmond and Roanoke. In 1986, Waterman Broadcasting purchased the station. Until August 15, 2004, it was the only full-power commercial outlet in the Charlottesville market affiliated with a major network with outside stations being seen on cable and over the air. On that date, WCAV (channel 19) signed-on becoming the area's first CBS affiliate and first station to mount a challenge against WVIR.

As part of the analog nightlight service, the station was required by the Federal Communications Commission (FCC) to leave its analog signal on-air for two months after the end of digital transition at an estimated cost to the station of $20,000 to broadcast an endless loop of instructional video on digital converter box installation. This was interrupted daily to carry local newscasts.

Waterman announced a deal to sell WVIR-TV to Gray Television on March 4, 2019. Gray already owned rival WCAV and ABC affiliate WVAW-LD (channel 16), which were concurrently sold to Lockwood Broadcast Group. WVIR became a sister station to Fox affiliate WAHU-CD (channel 27), which was not included in the sale and retained by Gray. The sale was approved on April 15. The transaction was completed on October 1.

WVIR entered the 2016–17 spectrum reallocation auction, electing to take $46,399,285 for its channel 32 allocation and move to the low-VHF band (channels 2 through 6). Chief engineer Bob Jenkins noted that the station was not particularly happy with moving to channel 2, but chose it over entering a channel-sharing agreement with another station. WVIR is one of 17 stations to move from another band to low-VHF; it and WHDF (Florence, Alabama) are the only commercial major network affiliates. Channels 2 through 6 were desirable for analog television, but are not widely used for digital television due to difficult indoor reception.

Gray's purpose in retaining WAHU-CD while selling its other two stations was to use its signal as a UHF simulcast of WVIR-TV's programming, allowing indoor reception in the core of the market; to that end, WAHU-CD has since been renamed WVIR-CD. The station was to move its signal from channel 32 to channel 2 by January 17, 2020. Equipment shipping and construction delays forced WVIR-TV to use WCAV's channel 19 facility on a temporary basis before it completed the relocation to channel 2 on March 18. Despite the UHF relay, WVIR-TV received hundreds of reception complaints in the following month and applied to increase its effective radiated power on channel 2 from 10 kW to 34 kW.

WVIR-DT3
WVIR-DT3, branded on-air as CW 29, is the CW+-affiliated third digital subchannel of WVIR-TV, broadcasting in 1080i high definition on channel 29.3.

History
The origins of WVIR-DT3 began on September 21, 1998, back when it was known as "WBHA" and "WBC", a cable-only affiliate of The WB Television Network that was originally managed and promoted by Cox Communications alongside the launch of The WB 100+ Station Group, a similar service to The CW Plus that was created to expand national coverage of The WB via primarily local origination channels managed by cable providers in markets ranked above #100 by Nielsen Media Research. Since it was a cable-exclusive outlet and therefore not licensed by the FCC, the channel used the "WBHA" and "WBC" call signs in a fictional manner. Prior to the launch of the cable channels, residents in the Charlottesville and Harrisonburg markets were only able to receive WB network programming on cable via the network's Washington, D.C. affiliate WFTY (which later became WBDC, now WDCW) or via Chicago-based superstation WGN on both cable and satellite.

On January 24, 2006, The WB and UPN announced the two networks would end broadcasting and merge. The new combined service would be called The CW. The letters would represent the first initial of corporate parents CBS (the parent company of UPN) and the Warner Bros. unit of Time Warner. At the network's launch on September 18, WVIR gained The CW affiliation through The CW Plus. The main station launched a new second digital subchannel to serve as the network's outlet in the Charlottesville and Harrisonburg areas. On September 13, 2007, WVIR began offering NBC Weather Plus on the second digital subchannel. As a result, The CW moved to a new third digital subchannel where it remains today. WVIR-DT3 often preempts programming from The CW Plus in order to air local shows.

On October 17, 2012, the subchannel started broadcasting in 720p HD.

Programming
Syndicated programming on the station includes Wheel of Fortune, Live with Kelly and Ryan, Jeopardy! and Dr. Phil.

Every year, WVIR holds an annual telethon to help raise money for University of Virginia Health System's Children's Hospital. The telethon, as part of the Children's Miracle Network, is held at the University of Virginia in Charlottesville. The broadcast consists of current and former WVIR on-air staff answering phones and talking to patients at the hospital.

News operation
WVIR presently broadcasts 36 hours of locally produced newscasts each week (with 6 hours on weekdays, and 3 hours each on Saturdays and Sundays). WVIR's news department covers both the immediate Charlottesville region and the Shenandoah Valley. In addition to its main studios, WVIR operates a bureau in The News Virginian newsroom (owned by BH Media) in Waynesboro and a sales office in Staunton.

Although the station does not operate a weather radar of its own, WVIR features live NOAA National Weather Service radar data from several regional sites. This is presented in a forecasting system on-air known as "Storm Team 29 Live Triple Doppler". It also offers local weather to computer users via the WeatherBug service. All weekday broadcasts except the prime time news at 10 are streamed live on WVIR's website. In September 2011, NBC29 News at Sunrise was extended which now airs from 4:30 to 7 a.m.

Alongside the launch of The CW, WVIR began producing a new nightly prime time newscast on WVIR-DT2 (now WVIR-DT3). Competing with a show already airing on Class A Fox affiliate WAHU-CD (produced by CBS affiliate WCAV), this was originally known as CW 29 News at 10 and featured a separate graphics package and news music theme. Eventually, the broadcast was renamed NBC 29 News at 10 and began mirroring programs seen on the main channel.

Like all CW Plus affiliates in the Eastern Time Zone, WVIR-DT3 aired the nationally syndicated morning show The Daily Buzz on weekdays from 6 to 9 a.m.

On April 19, 2008, WVIR began airing its newscasts in high definition (becoming first in the market to do so). However, the prime time shows on WVIR-DT3 were not included in the upgrade because the digital subchannel had, at that time, only aired in standard definition. On October 17, 2012, the 10 p.m. newscast on WVIR-DT3 began airing in HD.

Notable alumni
 Lonnie Quinn – Weather anchor/reporter (now at WCBS-TV in New York)

Technical information

Subchannels
The station's digital signal is multiplexed:

On September 18, 2006, this channel launched a new second digital subchannel to be the area's CW affiliate. On September 13, 2007, WVIR began offering NBC Weather Plus on that subchannel resulting in The CW moving to a new third subchannel. In December 2008, the national Weather Plus feed on 29.2 was shut down and a local weather channel programmed by WVIR was added in its place until March 30, 2015 when it became the newest affiliate of WeatherNation TV.

Analog-to-digital conversion
WVIR-TV shut down its analog signal, over UHF channel 29, at 12:30 p.m. on February 17, 2009, the original target date in which full-power television stations in the United States were to transition from analog to digital broadcasts under federal mandate (which was later pushed back to June 12, 2009). The station's digital signal remained on its pre-transition UHF channel 32. Through the use of PSIP, digital television receivers display the station's virtual channel as its former UHF analog channel 29.

Former translators
In addition to the main signal, WVIR could be seen on two digital translators. Both were located in the neighboring Harrisonburg–Staunton market, which lacked its own NBC affiliate. On October 2, 2019, the day after the sale of WVIR to Gray Television was completed, sister station and ABC affiliate WHSV-TV announced that it would convert the two translators into separate NBC/CW+ affiliates for Harrisonburg on December 1. Translator W30CT-D became WSVW-LD on the same day.

References

External links

NBC network affiliates
The CW affiliates
WeatherNation TV affiliates
True Crime Network affiliates
Grit (TV network) affiliates
VIR-TV
Television channels and stations established in 1973
1973 establishments in Virginia
Gray Television